Mount Griffith is a  mountain, standing  north-northeast of Mount Vaughan in the Hays Mountains of the Queen Maud Mountains of Antarctica. It was first observed and roughly mapped in December 1929 by the Byrd Antarctic Expedition (ByrdAE) geological party under Laurence Gould. It was remapped in December 1934 by the ByrdAE geological party under Quin Blackburn, and named by Richard E. Byrd for Raymond Griffith of Twentieth Century-Fox Pictures, who assisted in assembling motion-picture records of the expedition.

References

Mountains of the Ross Dependency
Amundsen Coast